Crime Buddies is the third album performed by rap group Steady Mobb'n. It was released on August 7, 2001, through Bomb Shelter / Colcash Records / Power Recordings and was produced by DJ Daryl.

Track listing

Personnel

Performers
 Crooked Eye - primary artist
 Billy Bavgate - primary artist
 Black Mafia Family - guest artist on "Bang Wit Me"
 Butch Cassidy - guest artist on "Bang to Dis"
 The Delinquents - guest artist on "Luv Ones"
 Nate Dogg - guest artist on "Let's Get It Crackin"
 E-40 - guest artist
 Guce - guest artist on "A Favor"
 Messy Marv - guest artist on "Big Fishes"
 Outlawz - guest artist on "Stop Poppin Shit"
 Sho Dawg - guest artist on "Zoning"
 Sons of Funk - guest artist on "Hott"
 Curren$y - guest artist on "On Your Job"
 Big Ramp 504 Ridahz - guest artist on "On Your Job"

Development team
 DJ Daryl Anderson - executive producer
 LeRoy McMath - executive producer
 Aaron Thompson - executive producer
 Craig B. - producer
 Berry Evans - photography
 Steve Knight - producer
 B.B. Moore - composer

References

2001 albums
Steady Mobb'n albums
Gangsta rap albums by American artists
West Coast hip hop albums